Eld James "Eddie" Martin (July 5, 1886 – September 16, 1968) was a politician from Alberta, Canada. He served in the Legislative Assembly of Alberta from 1940 to 1944 as an independent.

Political career
Martin ran as an independent candidate in the 1940 Alberta general election in a straight fight against incumbent Social Credit MLA William Bailey.  He defeated Bailey by 139 votes.  In the 1944 general election he was defeated in a four-way race by Social Credit candidate William Gilliland.

References

External links
Legislative Assembly of Alberta Members Listing

1886 births
1968 deaths
Independent Alberta MLAs
British emigrants to Canada